Isaac England House is a historic home located near Zion, Cecil County, Maryland, United States. It is a -story Georgian central hall plan brick house three bays across by one room deep. The house features a slate roof of medium pitch, and a single-story screened porch.

The Isaac England House was listed on the National Register of Historic Places in 1980.

References

External links
, including photo from 1978, Maryland Historical Trust

Houses on the National Register of Historic Places in Maryland
Houses in Cecil County, Maryland
Georgian architecture in Maryland
Federal architecture in Maryland
National Register of Historic Places in Cecil County, Maryland